13 Other Dimensions was released by The Giraffes through the Seattle label My Own Planet, on CD and vinyl in 1998. It is essentially a solo effort by Chris Ballew (ex-Presidents of the United States of America), recorded in Ballew's basement. The album was published as being a work by a fictional band composed of Ballew's childhood stuffed animals. Ballew's name appears nowhere on the album.

The Giraffes record was the first of a planned series of six made under a volume agreement with Ballew's main label, Columbia however only two albums were made, the second was released by Orange Recordings.  Roni Sarg, in Tucson Weekly'''s Rhythm and Views'' section, postulates that the putative stars of the Giraffes were chosen for their "photogenic cuteness" .

Track listing
All tracks written by Chris Ballew

 "Chocolate Dimension" 3:18
 "Lonely Chicken" 3:15
 "Hopeless (Rub It In)" 3:50
 "Every Crocodile" 3:45
 "Comin' Around" 1:41
 "Nothin' 2 Looz" 2:36
 "Brain on Yer Tongue" 3:02
 "Little Champion" 3:16
 "Pale Moon" 3:02
 "Ghost of a Bad Friend" 4:06
 "Slow Slow Fly" 2:44
 "Poodle Mouth" 2:56
 "Wither Without You" 2:17

Personnel
All instruments played by Chris Ballew.

Fictional
Giraffe - lead vocals, rhythm guitar

Munkey Sr. - lead guitar

Yoko Glick - piano, organ, clavinette

Barry Lowe - Basitar

Munkey Jr. - horns and strings

Chickey - drums

References

1998 debut albums
The Giraffes (Seattle band) albums